The dwarf planet Pluto has five natural satellites. In order of distance from Pluto, they are Charon, Styx, Nix, Kerberos, and Hydra. Charon, the largest, is mutually tidally locked with Pluto, and is massive enough that Pluto–Charon is sometimes considered a double dwarf planet.

History
The innermost and largest moon, Charon, was discovered by James Christy on 22 June 1978, nearly half a century after Pluto was discovered. This led to a substantial revision in estimates of Pluto's size, which had previously assumed that the observed mass and reflected light of the system were all attributable to Pluto alone.

Two additional moons were imaged by astronomers of the Pluto Companion Search Team preparing for the New Horizons mission and working with the Hubble Space Telescope on 15 May 2005, which received the provisional designations S/2005 P 1 and S/2005 P 2. The International Astronomical Union officially named these moons Nix (or Pluto II, the inner of the two moons, formerly P 2) and Hydra (Pluto III, the outer moon, formerly P 1), on 21 June 2006. Kerberos, announced on 20 July 2011, was discovered while searching for Plutonian rings. Styx, announced on 7 July 2012, was discovered while looking for potential hazards for New Horizons.

Charon

Charon is about half the diameter of Pluto and is massive enough (nearly one eighth of the mass of Pluto) that the system's barycenter lies between them, approximately 960 km above Pluto's surface. Charon and Pluto are also tidally locked, so that they always present the same face toward each other. The IAU General Assembly in August 2006 considered a proposal that Pluto and Charon be reclassified as a double planet, but the proposal was abandoned.
Like Pluto, Charon is a perfect sphere to within measurement uncertainty.

Small moons 

Pluto's four small circumbinary moons orbit Pluto at two to four times the distance of Charon, ranging from Styx at 42,700 kilometres to Hydra at 64,800 kilometres from the barycenter of the system. They have nearly circular prograde orbits in the same orbital plane as Charon.

All are much smaller than Charon.  Nix and Hydra, the two larger, are roughly 42 and 55 kilometers on their longest axis respectively, and Styx and Kerberos are 7 and 12 kilometers respectively.  All four are irregularly shaped.

Characteristics 

The Pluto system is highly compact and largely empty: Prograde moons could stably orbit Pluto out to 53% of the Hill radius (the gravitational zone of Pluto's influence) of 6 million km, or out to 69% for retrograde moons. However, only the inner 3% of the region where prograde orbits would be stable is occupied by satellites, and the region from Styx to Hydra is packed so tightly that there is little room for further moons with stable orbits within this region.
An intense search conducted by New Horizons confirmed that no moons larger than 4.5 km in diameter exist out to a distances up to 180,000 km from Pluto (6% of the stable region for prograde moons), assuming Charon-like albedoes of 0.38 (for smaller distances, this threshold is still smaller).

The orbits of the moons are confirmed to be circular and coplanar, with inclinations differing less than 0.4° and eccentricities less than 0.005.

The discovery of Nix and Hydra suggested that Pluto could have a ring system. Small-body impacts can create debris that can form into a ring system. However, data from a deep-optical survey by the Advanced Camera for Surveys on the Hubble Space Telescope, by occultation studies, and later by New Horizons, suggest that no ring system is present.

Resonances
Styx, Nix, and Hydra are thought to be in a 3-body orbital resonance with orbital periods in a ratio of 18:22:33; the respective ratio of orbits is 11:9:6. The ratios should be exact when orbital precession is taken into account. Hydra and Nix are in a simple 2:3 resonance. Styx and Nix are in an 11:9 resonance, while the resonance between Styx and Hydra has a ratio of 11:6. This means that in a recurring cycle there are 11 orbits of Styx for every 9 of Nix and 6 of Hydra. The ratios of synodic periods are then such that there are 5 Styx–Hydra conjunctions and 3 Nix–Hydra conjunctions for every 2 conjunctions of Styx and Nix. As with the Laplace resonance of the Galilean satellites of Jupiter, triple conjunctions never occur.  librates about 180° with an amplitude of at least 10°.

All of the outer circumbinary moons are also close to mean motion resonance with the Charon–Pluto orbital period. Styx, Nix, Kerberos, and Hydra are in a 1:3:4:5:6 sequence of near resonances, with Styx approximately 5.4% from its resonance, Nix approximately 2.7%, Kerberos approximately 0.6%, and Hydra approximately 0.3%. It may be that these orbits originated as forced resonances when Charon was tidally boosted into its current synchronous orbit, and then released from resonance as Charon's orbital eccentricity was tidally damped. The Pluto–Charon pair creates strong tidal forces, with the gravitational field at the outer moons varying by 15% peak to peak.

However, it was calculated that a resonance with Charon could boost either Nix or Hydra into its current orbit, but not both: boosting Hydra would have required a near-zero Charonian eccentricity of 0.024, whereas boosting Nix would have required a larger eccentricity of at least 0.05. This suggests that Nix and Hydra were instead captured material, formed around Pluto–Charon, and migrated inward until they were trapped in resonance with Charon. The existence of Kerberos and Styx may support this idea.

Rotation

Prior to the New Horizons mission, 
Nix, Hydra, Styx, and Kerberos  
were predicted to rotate chaotically or tumble. 

However,  New Horizons imaging found that they had not tidally
spun down to near a spin synchronous state where chaotic rotation or tumbling would be expected.
  New Horizons imaging found that all 4 moons were at high obliquity. Either 
they were born that way, or they were tipped by a spin precession resonance. 
  Styx may be experiencing intermittent and chaotic obliquity variations.

Mark R. Showalter had speculated that, "Nix can flip its entire pole. It could actually be possible to spend a day on Nix in which the sun rises in the east and sets in the north. It is almost random-looking in the way it rotates." 
Only one other moon, Saturn's moon Hyperion, is known to tumble, though it is likely that Haumea's moons do so as well.

Origin

It is suspected that Pluto's satellite system was created by a massive collision, similar to the "big whack" thought to have created the Moon. In both cases, the high angular momenta of the moons can only be explained by such a scenario. The nearly circular orbits of the smaller moons suggests that they were also formed in this collision, rather than being captured Kuiper Belt objects. This and their near orbital resonances with Charon (see below) suggest that they formed closer to Pluto than they are at present and migrated outward as Charon reached its current orbit. Their grey color is different from that of Pluto, one of the reddest bodies in the Solar System. This is thought to be due to a loss of volatiles during the impact or subsequent coalescence, leaving the surfaces of the moons dominated by water ice. However, such an impact should have created additional debris (more moons), yet no moons or rings were discovered by New Horizons, ruling out any more moons of significant size orbiting Pluto.

List 
Pluto's moons are listed here by orbital period, from shortest to longest. Charon, which is massive enough to have collapsed into a spheroid at some point in its history, is highlighted in light purple. Pluto has been added for comparison. All elements are with respect to the Pluto-Charon barycenter. The mean separation distance between the centers of Pluto and Charon is 19,596 km.

Scale model of the Pluto system

Mutual events

Transits occur when one of Pluto's moons passes between Pluto and the Sun. This occurs when one of the satellites' orbital nodes (the points where their orbits cross Pluto's ecliptic) lines up with Pluto and the Sun. This can only occur at two points in Pluto's orbit; coincidentally, these points are near Pluto's perihelion and aphelion.  Occultations occur when Pluto passes in front of and blocks one of Pluto's satellites.

Charon has an angular diameter of 4 degrees of arc as seen from the surface of Pluto; the Sun appears much smaller, only 39 to 65 arcseconds. By comparison, the Moon as viewed from Earth has an angular diameter of only 31 minutes of arc, or just over half a degree of arc. Therefore, Charon would appear to have eight times the diameter, or 25 times the area of the Moon; this is due to Charon's proximity to Pluto rather than size, as despite having just over one-third of a Lunar radius, Earth's Moon is 20 times more distant from Earth's surface as Charon is from Pluto's. This proximity further ensures that a large proportion of Pluto's surface can experience an eclipse. Because Pluto always presents the same face towards Charon due to tidal locking, only the Charon-facing hemisphere experiences solar eclipses by Charon.

The smaller moons can cast shadows elsewhere. The angular diameters of the four smaller moons (as seen from Pluto) are uncertain. Nix's is 3–9 minutes of arc and Hydra's is 2–7 minutes. These are much larger than the Sun's angular diameter, so total solar eclipses are caused by these moons.

Eclipses by Styx and Kerberos are more difficult to estimate, as both moons are very irregular, with angular dimensions of 76.9 x 38.5 to 77.8 x 38.9 arcseconds for Styx, and 67.6 x 32.0 to 68.0 x 32.2 for Kerberos. As such, Styx has no annular eclipses, its widest axis being more than 10 arcseconds larger than the Sun at its largest. However, Kerberos, although slightly larger, cannot make total eclipses as its largest minor axis is a mere 32 arcseconds. Eclipses by Kerberos and Styx will entirely consist of partial and hybrid eclipses, with total eclipses being extremely rare.

The next period of mutual events due to Charon will begin in October 2103, peak in 2110, and end in January 2117. During this period, solar eclipses will occur once each Plutonian day, with a maximum duration of 90 minutes.

Exploration
The Pluto system was visited by the New Horizons spacecraft in July 2015. Images with resolutions of up to 330 meters per pixel were returned of Nix and up to 1.1 kilometers per pixel of Hydra. Lower-resolution images were returned of Styx and Kerberos.

Notes

References

Sources
 
 
 
 
 Codex Regius (2016), Pluto & Charon, CreateSpace Independent Publishing Platform 
 IAU Circular No. 8625, describing the discovery of 2005 P1 and P2
 IAU Circular No. 8686, reporting a more neutral color for 2005 P2
 IAU Circular No. 8723 announcing the names of Nix and Hydra
 Background Information Regarding Our Two Newly Discovered Satellites of Pluto – The website of the discoverers of Nix and Hydra

External links

Scott S. Sheppard: Pluto Moons
Interactive 3D visualisation of the Plutonian system
Animation of the Plutonian system
Hubble Spots Possible New Moons Around Pluto (NASA)
Two More Moons Discovered Orbiting Pluto (SPACE.com)
New Horizons Mission Site

 
Lists of moons
Articles containing video clips